The Strasbourg Agreement Concerning the International Patent Classification (or IPC), also known as the IPC Agreement, is an international treaty that established a common classification for patents for invention, inventors' certificates, utility models and utility certificates, known as the "International Patent Classification" (IPC). The treaty was signed in Strasbourg, France, on March 24, 1971, it entered into force on October 7, 1975, and was amended on September 28, 1979.

States that are parties to the Paris Convention for the Protection of Industrial Property (1883) may become party to the Strasbourg Agreement. As of March 2021, there were 64 contracting parties to the Strasbourg Agreement. The Holy See, the Iran and Liechtenstein signed the Agreement in 1971 but have not ratified it.

See also
European Convention on the International Classification of Patents for Invention (1954)

References

External links
Strasbourg Agreement Concerning the International Patent Classification in the WIPO Lex database — official website of WIPO.
 The full text of the Strasbourg Agreement Concerning the International Patent Classification

Patent law treaties
Patent classifications
World Intellectual Property Organization treaties
Treaties concluded in 1971
Treaties entered into force in 1975
1971 in France
Treaties of Albania
Treaties of Argentina
Treaties of Armenia
Treaties of Australia
Treaties of Austria
Treaties of Azerbaijan
Treaties of Belarus
Treaties of Belgium
Treaties of Bosnia and Herzegovina
Treaties of the military dictatorship in Brazil
Treaties of Bulgaria
Treaties of Canada
Treaties of the People's Republic of China
Treaties of Croatia
Treaties of Cuba
Treaties of the Czech Republic
Treaties of Czechoslovakia
Treaties of North Korea
Treaties of Denmark
Treaties of Egypt
Treaties of Estonia
Treaties of Finland
Treaties of France
Treaties of West Germany
Treaties of East Germany
Treaties of Greece
Treaties of Guinea
Treaties of Ireland
Treaties of Israel
Treaties of Italy
Treaties of Japan
Treaties of Kazakhstan
Treaties of Kyrgyzstan
Treaties of Luxembourg
Treaties of Malawi
Treaties of Mexico
Treaties of Monaco
Treaties of Mongolia
Treaties of Montenegro
Treaties of the Netherlands
Treaties of Norway
Treaties of Poland
Treaties of Portugal
Treaties of South Korea
Treaties of Moldova
Treaties of Romania
Treaties of the Soviet Union
Treaties of Serbia
Treaties of Slovakia
Treaties of Slovenia
Treaties of Francoist Spain
Treaties of Suriname
Treaties of Sweden
Treaties of Switzerland
Treaties of Tajikistan
Treaties of North Macedonia
Treaties of Trinidad and Tobago
Treaties of Turkmenistan
Treaties of Turkey
Treaties of Ukraine
Treaties of the United Kingdom
Treaties of the United States
Treaties of Uruguay
Treaties of Uzbekistan
Treaties extended to the Netherlands Antilles
Treaties extended to Aruba
Treaties extended to Greenland
Treaties extended to the Faroe Islands
Treaties extended to Surinam (Dutch colony)